The Sun Fast 41 is a French sailboat that was designed by American Doug Peterson as a cruiser-racer and first built in 1990.

The Sun Fast 41 is part of the Sun Fast sailboat range and is a development of Peterson's 1984 Sun Legende 41 design.

Production
The design was built by Jeanneau in France, from 1990 to 1994, with 548 boats completed, but it is now out of production.

Design
The Sun Fast 41 is a recreational keelboat, built predominantly of fiberglass, with wood trim. The hull is solid fiberglass, with Kevlar reinforcement, while the deck is a fiberglass-balsa sandwich. It has a masthead sloop rig, with a deck-stepped mast, two sets of unswept spreaders and aluminum spars with stainless steel wire rigging. The hull has a raked stem, a reverse transom with steps to a swimming platform, an internally mounted spade-type rudder controlled by a wheel and a fixed fin keel with cast iron or lead ballast or optional keel and centerboard.

The design can be equipped with sleeping accommodation for as many as 12 people, but for cruising a typical arrangement is for six people. This includes a double "V"-berth in the bow cabin, a "U"-shaped settee and a straight settee in the main cabin and two aft cabins, each with a double berth. The galley is located on the port side at the companionway ladder. The galley is "L"-shaped and is equipped with a two-burner stove, an ice box and a double sink. A navigation station is opposite the galley, on the starboard side. The head is located just aft of the bow cabin on the port side and includes a shower. There are also sinks in each of the aft cabins.

Operational history
The boat was at one time supported by a class club that organized racing events, the Sun Fast Association.

See also
List of sailing boat types

References

External links

Keelboats
1990s sailboat type designs
Sailing yachts
Sailboat type designs by Doug Peterson
Sailboat types built by Jeanneau